Hapaline can refer to the following:
 Any of the New World monkeys of the family Callitrichidae, which was incorrectly renamed Hapalinae for a time.
 Any of the aroid plants of the genus Hapaline.